École des Pionniers may refer to:
École élémentaire catholique des Pionniers, located in Orléans, Ontario, Canada
École des Pionniers (British Columbia), located in Port Coquitlam, British Columbia, Canada
École des Pionniers (New Brunswick), located in Quispamsis, New Brunswick, Canada